Kikorongo–Ishaka Road is a road in the Western Region of Uganda, connecting the towns of Kikorongo in Kasese District with Ishaka in Bushenyi District.

Location
This road starts at Kikorongo, on the Fort Portal–Kasese–Mpondwe Road. The coordinates of the road near Rubirizi are 0°16'37.0"S, 30°06'27.0"E (Latitude:-0.276949; Longitude:30.107488).

Overview
This road is an important transport corridor for people and goods from Rwanda, Burundi and the Western Region of Uganda, destined for South Sudan.

See also
List of roads in Uganda

References

External links
 Uganda National Road Authority Homepage

Roads in Uganda
Kasese District
Rubirizi District
Bushenyi District
Western Region, Uganda